The 1997–98 season was the 74th season in the existence of AEK Athens F.C. and the 39th consecutive season in the top flight of Greek football. They competed in the Alpha Ethniki, the Greek Cup and the UEFA Cup Winners' Cup. The season began on 31 August 1997 and finished on 17 May 1998.

Overview

In the summer of 1997, Michalis Trochanas, no longer able to bear the weight of managing the club, but also with the vast majority of the fans against him, unsuccessfully looked for a buyer. Finally, the season started with this major shareholder for another year and Alexis Kougias in the position of president. The team lost 2 more important players, Temur Ketsbaia and Vasilios Borbokis, who left for England. Also, Stelios Manolas who was against the club's major shareholder, did not join in the team at the start of the season. On the other hand, Giannis Kalitzakis, Grétarsson, Katsavos, Alexis and Kefalas were transferred to the club. The first gathering of the team was episodic with about 2,000 gathered fans "boiling" against the administration. Tensions and incidents occurred between the fans, with Alexis Kougias and Vasilis Karagiannis being the main victims. The season started with these adverse conditions and the Romanian coach Dumitru Dumitriu.

The team started the championship relatively well, however and after a few months the psychology of the world rose, since Michalis Trochanas eventually sold his shares to the financially powerful, English multinational ENIC. The former player of AEK, Lakis Nikolaou took over as president, Manolas returned, there were rich contract renewals and in January some transfers were made. Despite being the winter champions, AEK were affected by the injuries on the roster, left quite behind in the league table and eventually could not claim the title from Olympiacos. Towards the end of the season, Dumitriu was fired, who had already started to have problems with the administration, during the January transfer window. In his position, as an interim, Antonis Minou was hired to close the season.

In the Greek Cup, AEK after they passed through the first two rounds without a match were drawn at the round of 32 against Skoda Xanthi from which they were eliminated with 2 defeats. 

AEK, taking advantage of their very good coefficient in the UEFA ranking, had a good draw in the UEFA Cup Winners' Cup coming against Dinaburg from Latvia. AEK, due to the absence of Nikolaidis, had a problem against the Latvians, who bowed only after the dismissal of their goalkeeper shortly after half an hour and thus AEK gifted the Latvians with 5 goals in the "cold" Nikos Goumas Stadium, clearly turning the rematch into a formal one procedure. The rematch in Daugava Stadium went as expected with AEK winning by 2–4 and their mission was accomplished. Next opponent were the Austrians of Sturm Graz. As expected the game was lopsided, but in the end the stadium played its part and AEK took a safe score with two goals in the last quarter of the game. Unfortunately, the game claimed the life of Christos Kostis, who in a collision with Sidorchuk was seriously injured, effectively ending his career that night, as he never managed to return. The revenge at Arnold Schwarzenegger Stadium was more difficult than Dumitriu and his footballers expected. Sturm pressed, toiled, were well set up on the pitch, but managed nothing more than scoring a goal 8 minutes before the end of the match. AEK faced Lokomotiv Moscow for the first time in the quarter-finals and in one of the biggest challenges in their history. Nea Filadelfeia was full of people waiting for a qualifying score to make the rematch in frozen Moscow an easy task for the double-headed eagle. But AEK was not performing as expected, having a bad day and at the same time facing an excellent pressing and a suffocating pressure and overlap from the defense of the guests, AEK did not reach a goal and ended the match with 9 players due to the dismissal of Doboș in the 75th minute and Karagiannis in the stoppage time. Despite the 0–0 first leg, AEK were going to Moscow to qualify for the semi-finals. AEK started the game numbly, but went to the locker rooms for halftime with a 0–0 draw. The hosts were pressing and in the 53rd minute made it 1–0. AEK were getting up and missing a lot of chances. In the 66th minute, AEK's pressure payd off and Maladenis won a penalty which Kopitsis converted into a goal. AEK had the qualification in their hands and had now imposed themselves over Lokomotiv. The Russians were naturally pressing leaving their defenses exposed, with AEK's counterattacks reaching the opposing area with claims, but either the final pass or the final effort is bad. Anxiety and nervousness were evident in AEK's game. At the 90th minute, Sebwe made a run with the ball at his feet, neutralized everyone and passed to Nikolaidis. The opposing goalkeeper was out of phase and the forward of AEK had to score one of the easiest and most important goals of his career. Either out of overconfidence or out of too much anxiety, he took a lifeless shot from the small area and into an empty net. But his finish was bad and weak, which was caught by a Lokomotiv defender who came behind the AEK striker and collected the ball, while in the last phase of the match Lokomotiv entered the AEK area and after many counters, bad clearances of the defenders and constant crosses somehow the ball ended up in the net of Atmatsidis, leaving AEK unexpectedly out of the tournament in a qualification that would be historic.

Highlight of the season the unprecedented "absolute" in derby victories against Olympiacos and Panathinaikos, at both home and away. Also the season was marked by the retirement of the great Stelios Manolas at the end of the year. The best players of the season for the team are Nikolaidis, Atmatsidis, Savevski, Manolas, Kasapis, Batista, Maladenis and Grétarsson, while the top scorer of the season for AEK was Demis Nikolaidis with 19 goals.

Players

Squad information

NOTE: The players are the ones that have been announced by the AEK Athens' press release. No edits should be made unless a player arrival or exit is announced. Updated 30 June 1998, 23:59 UTC+3.

Transfers

In

Summer

Winter

Out

Summer

Winter

Loan in

Winter

Loan out

Summer

Renewals

Overall transfer activity

Expenditure
Summer:  ₯80,000,000

Winter:  ₯0

Total:  ₯80,000,000

Income
Summer:  ₯400,000,000

Winter:  ₯0

Total:  ₯400,000,000

Net Totals
Summer:  ₯320,000,000

Winter:  ₯0

Total:  ₯320,000,000

Pre-season and friendlies

Alpha Ethniki

League table

Results summary

Results by Matchday

Fixtures

Greek Cup

AEK Athens entered the Greek Cup at the Round of 32.

Round of 32

UEFA Cup Winners' Cup

First round

Second round

Quarter-finals

Statistics

Squad statistics

! colspan="11" style="background:#FFDE00; text-align:center" | Goalkeepers
|-

! colspan="11" style="background:#FFDE00; color:black; text-align:center;"| Defenders
|-

! colspan="11" style="background:#FFDE00; color:black; text-align:center;"| Midfielders
|-

! colspan="11" style="background:#FFDE00; color:black; text-align:center;"| Forwards
|-

! colspan="11" style="background:#FFDE00; color:black; text-align:center;"| Left during Winter Transfer Window
|-

|-
|}

Disciplinary record

|-
! colspan="17" style="background:#FFDE00; text-align:center" | Goalkeepers

|-
! colspan="17" style="background:#FFDE00; color:black; text-align:center;"| Defenders

|-
! colspan="17" style="background:#FFDE00; color:black; text-align:center;"| Midfielders

|-
! colspan="17" style="background:#FFDE00; color:black; text-align:center;"| Forwards

|-
! colspan="17" style="background:#FFDE00; color:black; text-align:center;"| Left during Winter Transfer window

|-
|}

Starting 11

References

External links
AEK Athens F.C. Official Website

1997-98
Greek football clubs 1997–98 season